The 2023–24 Primeira Liga will be the 90th season of the Primeira Liga, the top professional league for Portuguese association football clubs, and the third season under the current Liga Portugal title. This is the seventh Primeira Liga season to use video assistant referee (VAR).

Teams

Changes

Stadia and locations

League table

References

Primeira Liga seasons
Portugal
Scheduled association football competitions